Dante Guindani (11 June 1899 – 6 February 1929) was an Italian cyclist. He competed in two events at the 1920 Summer Olympics.

References

External links
 

1899 births
1929 deaths
Italian male cyclists
Olympic cyclists of Italy
Cyclists at the 1920 Summer Olympics
Cyclists from Cremona